Abu Dhabi Securities Exchange (A.D.X.; formerly Abu Dhabi Securities Market (ADSM)) is a stock exchange in Abu Dhabi, United Arab Emirates (UAE).

Listed companies by sector

List provided by Emirates Securities & Commodities Authority (SCA), including 73 companies in 4 sectors, whereas Abu Dhabi Securities Exchange provides more sectors.

Banking Sector

ADCB:	        Abu Dhabi Commercial Bank        
ADIB:		Abu Dhabi Islamic Bank           
BOS:		Bank of Sharjah                  
CBI:		Commercial Bank International 
FGB:		First Gulf Bank 
FH:		Finance House 
FAB:        First Abu Dhabi Bank
INVESTB:	Invest Bank 
NBAD:	        National Bank of Abu Dhabi 
NBF:		National Bank of Fujairah
NBQ:		National Bank of Umm Al Qawain 
NBS:		Sharjah Islamic Bank 
NIB:            Noor Bank 
RAKBANK:	The National Bank of Ras Al Khaima in UAE 
UAB:		United Arab Bank 
UNB:		Union National Bank

Energy Sector

ADNOCDRILL:	        ADNOC Drilling 
ADNOCDIST:	        ADNOC 
TAQA:	        TAQA

Insurance Sector

AAAIC:	        Al-Ain Ahlia Insurance Company 
ABNIC:	        Al Buhaira National Insurance Company 
ADNIC:	        Abu Dhabi National Insurance Company 
AKIC:		Al Khazna Insurance Company 
AWNIC:	        Al Wathba National Insurance Company 
DHAFRA:	Al Dhafra Insurance Company 
EIC:		Emirates Insurance Company
FNI:		Al Fujairah National Insurance Company
GCIC:           Green Crescent Insurance Company (GCC)
RAKNIC:	Ras Al Khaima National Insurance Company
SICO:		Sharjah Insurance Company 
TKFL:		Abu Dhabi National Takaful Company 
UIC:		United Insurance Company 
UNION:	        Union Insurance Company
METHAQ:        Methaq Takaful Insurance Co. 
WATANIA: National Takaful Company (Watania)

Services Sector

AABAR:	        Aabar Petroleum Investments Company 
ADAVIATION:	Abu Dhabi Aviation Company 
ALDAR:	        AL DAR properties 
ASMAK:	        International Fish Farming Company 
DRIVE:	        Emirates Driving Company 
ETISALAT:	Emirates Telecommunications Company  
FTC:		Fujairah Trading Centre 
GMPC:	        Gulf Medical Projects Company
LIVESTOCK:	LIVESTOCK Company Gulf
NMDC:	        National Marine Dredging Company 
OEIHC:	        Oman & Emirates Investment Holding Company 
OILC:		Oasis International Leasing Company 
PALTEL:	Palestine Telecommunications Company 
QTEL:		Qatar Telecommunications 
RAKPROP:	Ras Al Khaima Properties Company 
SOROUH:	Sorouh Real Estate 
SUDATEL:	Sudan Telecommunications Company Limited

Industry & Hotels Sector

ADNH:	       Abu Dhabi National Hotels Company 
ADSB:	       Abu Dhabi Ship Building Company 
AGTHIA:       Emirates Food Stuff & Mineral Water Company 
ARKAN:	       Arkan Building Materials Company
BILDCO:       Abu Dhabi National Company for Building Materials 
DANA:	       Dana Gas 
FBICO:	       Fujirah Building Industries 
FCI:	       Fujirah Cement Industries Company 
FOODCO:       Foodco Holding 
GCEM:	       Gulf Cement Company 
JULPHAR:      Gulf Pharmaceutical Industries 
NCTH:	       National Corporation of Tourism 
QCEM:	       Umm Al Qaiwain Cement Industries Company
RAKCC:	       Ras Al Khaimah Cement Company 
RAKCEC:       Ras Al Khaimah Ceramics 
RAKWCT:       Ras Al Khaimah Company for White Cement & Construction Materials 
RAPCO:	       Ras Al Khaimah Poultry & Feed Company 
SCIDC:	       Sharjah Cement & Industrial development Company 
TAQA:	       Abu Dhabi National Energy Company 
UCC:	       Union Cement Company

See also
Dubai Financial Market
Dubai International Financial Exchange

References

External links
A.D.X. - Abu Dhabi Securities Exchange homepage
 - Stocks 

Financial services companies established in 2000
Stock exchanges in the United Arab Emirates
Stock exchanges in the Middle East
Emirati companies established in 2000